Kubala or Aces Looking for Peace (Spanish: Los ases buscan la paz) is a 1955 Spanish sports film directed by Arturo Ruiz Castillo. It portrays the life of the Hungarian footballer Ladislao Kubala who plays himself. Kubala moved to Spain where he played for FC Barcelona and the Spain national football team. The film has a Cold War anti-communist theme which was in line with the policy of General Franco's regime. A film about and starring the Argentine-born Real Madrid player Alfredo Di Stéfano was released the following year.

Cast
 Ladislao Kubala
 Irán Eory
 Mariano Asquerino
 Antonio Ozores
 José Guardiola
 Antonio Queipo
 Eugenio Testa
 Branco Kubala
 Laci Kubala
 Gérard Tichy
 Antonio Bofarull
 Juan Montfort
 Alfonso Tuset
 Matías Prats
 José Samitier
 Antonio Ramallets
 Estanislao Basora

References

Bibliography 
 Bentley, Bernard. A Companion to Spanish Cinema. Boydell & Brewer 2008.

External links 
 

1950s sports films
1955 films
1950s Spanish-language films
Films directed by Arturo Ruiz Castillo
Spanish association football films
Spanish black-and-white films
1950s Spanish films